Wang Jian (born October 1962) is a Chinese computer scientist currently serving as chief technology officer of Alibaba Group. He is an editor of Communications of the ACM.

Biography
Wang was born in October 1962. He received his bachelor's degree and doctor's degree from Hangzhou University in 1984 and 1990, respectively. After graduating, he joined the faculty of the university and was promoted to professor in 1992. He was director of Department of Psychology between 1994 and 1998. In 1996 he was a visiting professor at New York State University. In 1999 he joined the Microsoft Research Asia. In September 2008 he was offered a position as chief architect of Alibaba Group. In August 2012 he became chief technology officer. In October 2019, Hurun Report listed him as the 1008th richest person in China with an estimated wealth of 4.1 billion yuan.

Honours and awards
 November 22, 2019 Member of the Chinese Academy of Engineering (CAE)

References

1962 births
Living people
Alibaba Group people
Hangzhou University alumni
Businesspeople in information technology
Members of the Chinese Academy of Engineering